The 2004 Liga de Fútbol Profesional Boliviano (Professional Football League of Bolivia) season had 12 teams in competition. Club Bolívar won the championship.

Results

Note: The season is divided into Torneo Apertura and Torneo Clausura, played in different formats. The above table is only for the Torneo Apertura; information for the Torneo Clausura is missing.

References

Bolivian Primera División seasons
Bolivia
1